Feo Aladag is an Austrian film director, screenwriter, producer, and actress best known for her film When We Leave, which won the 2010 Tribeca Film Festival.

Early life and acting
Aladag was born as Feodora Schenk in 1972; She later married fellow director Züli Aladağ. She began her film career as an actress, completing her training in London and Vienna from 1990–1995.  While studying acting she also completed a masters in Psychology and Journalism, continuing on to receive her Doctorate of Philosophy in 2000.

She acted in numerous film and television productions while attending master-classes and directing seminars at the European Film Academy and the German Film and Television Academy. During this time she also maintained a career as a successful scriptwriter and commercial film director; directing various spots for Amnesty International and writing scripts for the German television series Tatort.

When We Leave

Aladag's directorial debut When We Leave had its world premiere at the 60th Berlin International Film Festival in 2010, where it won the Europa Cinema Label Award.  It went on to win the World Narrative Feature Competition at the 2010 Tribeca Film Festival, as well as the German Film Award for Best Actress for Sibel Kekilli, and the for Best Film in Bronze.

The film's festival run included several international film festivals, where it won some "best of" and audience awards at festivals like the São Paulo International Film Festival, the Fort Lauderdale Film Festival and the Angers European First Film Festival in France.

When We Leave was selected as the German entry for the Best Foreign Language Film at the 83rd Academy Awards, but didn't make the final shortlist.

Inbetween Worlds

In June 2013, Independent Artists wrapped their new feature film Inbetween Worlds, which was secretly filmed on location in the region of Mazar-i-Sharif and Kunduz in Afghanistan. Inbetween Worlds had its premiere at the competition section of the 64th Berlin International Film Festival in 2014 and was nominated for the German Directors Award Metropolis and the VGF Producers Newcomers Award in 2014.

Independent Artists Filmproduction 
In 2005 Aladag founded Independent Artists Filmproduktion.  Based in Berlin, Germany, Independent Artists was the production company behind When We Leave and Inbetween Worlds, as well as Aladag's upcoming projects.

References

External links

 
 Independent Artists, Feo Aladag's Berlin-Based Production Company

1972 births
Living people
Austrian film actresses
Austrian film directors
Austrian television actresses
Austrian women film directors